Prospect Point (March 4, 1978 – September 23, 2016) was one of the longest lived Thoroughbred on record. He lived to the age of 38 years and 203 days before dying on 23 September 2016.

Background and Family 
Prospect Point was bred in Kentucky by Forest Retreat Farms and Lloyd I. Miller. He was sired by First Dawn, an unraced minor stallion bred by the great Ogden Phipps. His paternal granddam, Lovely Morning, was a half sister to American Champion Two-Year-Old Male Horses and Grade I winners Successor and Bold Lad. His damsire, Tronado, was an Argentinean bred who won graded stakes in both the United States and Argentina, most notably winning the Donn Handicap and Arlington Handicap.

During his racing career, Prospect Point was owned by Claudie M. Godsey, who also trained him. Godsey still trains horses as of 2017.

Racing career 
In a racing career of five years, Prospect Park started 72 times, winning 7 races, finishing second in 8, and finishing third in 10. He collected $28,553 in earnings.

Though he raced primarily at Ellis Park, he also raced at Churchill Downs, Keeneland, Waterford Park (now Mountaineer Park), and Latonia Park (now Turfway Park). He never contested a stakes race or handicap.

Prospect Point broke his maiden on February 24, 1981 in a maiden claiming race. The race was his 9th start. His last win came on August 21, 1984, at Ellis Park, in a claiming race. He last raced on July 10, 1985 in the fifth race at Waterford Park, a $1,500 claiming race, in which he finished 11th.

He was retired some point after 1985.

Retirement 
According to eventual owner Gail Earle, attempts were made to turn him into a polo pony after his retirement, but he did not take to the sport.

Earle, a resident of Pageland, South Carolina, acquired Prospect Point in 1988, and used him as a hunter-jumper until 1993, when he developed lameness issues. Afterwards, he was still ridden for recreational purposes. Prospect Point was ridden until age 32, after which he became a pasture horse.

In his advanced age, Prospect Point was noted to be quite healthy, happy and bright, which is rare for older horses. His main health issues were poor eyesight and arthritis, which prevented him from frolicking, something he often wanted to do. Like many older horses, he was slow, and had lost a few teeth over time. His favorite activity was playing with his pasture mate, a donkey.

Prospect Point's longest live record was broken by Japanese thoroughbred, named Arrow Hamakiyo, renamed Charlotte later, who lived to be 40 years old.

Death 
Prospect Point’s health began to rapidly deteriorate in mid 2016. The horse had lost his appetite “out of the blue," and still refused to eat after being placed on antibiotics, losing a great amount of weight in the process. His body shutting down, Earle did not want him to suffer, so she made the decision to euthanize him.

Prospect Point was euthanized on September 23, 2016 at the age of 38 years and 204 days.

It is unknown as to why Prospect Point lived as long as he did. The average life expectancy for a Thoroughbred is between the ages of 25-28.

Merrick, Tango Duke and Others 
The second longest lived Thoroughbred on record is Merrick, a track record-setting gelding born in 1903, who died in 1941. He lived to the age of 38 years and 52 days. Merrick is the horse for which the Merrick Inn in Lexington, Kentucky is named after, and he is buried there.

Reports have also stated that an Australian gelding named Tango Duke lived until the age of 42.

In Japan, as a male horse,  lived until he was 40 years and 81 days. Also, as a female horse,  lived until 38 years and 67 days.

The living male horse Dead Solid Perfect is 38 years and 242 days old as of January 1, 2022.

Pedigree

References 

1978 racehorse births
2016 racehorse deaths
Racehorses trained in the United States
Racehorses bred in Kentucky
Thoroughbred family 8-f